The 2021–22 season was the 114th season in the existence of Atalanta B.C. and the club's 11th consecutive season in the top flight of Italian football. In addition to the domestic league, Atalanta participated in this season's editions of the Coppa Italia, the UEFA Champions League and the UEFA Europa League.

Players

Transfers

In

Out

Pre-season and friendlies

Competitions

Overview

Serie A

League table

Results summary

Results by round

Matches
The league fixtures were announced on 14 July 2021. This is the first season with an asymmetrical calendar, i.e., the order of fixtures in the second half of the season (ritorno) is different from the that of the first half (andata).

Coppa Italia

UEFA Champions League

Group stage

The draw for the group stage was held on 26 August 2021.

UEFA Europa League

Knockout phase

Knockout round play-offs
The knockout round play-offs draw was held on 13 December 2021.

Round of 16
The draw for the round of 16 was held on 25 February 2022.

Quarter-finals
The draw for the quarter-finals was held on 18 March 2022.

Statistics

Appearances and goals

|-
! colspan=14 style=background:#DCDCDC; text-align:center| Goalkeepers

|-
! colspan=14 style=background:#DCDCDC; text-align:center| Defenders

|-
! colspan=14 style=background:#DCDCDC; text-align:center| Midfielders

|-
! colspan=14 style=background:#DCDCDC; text-align:center| Forwards

|-
! colspan=14 style=background:#DCDCDC; text-align:center| Players transferred out during the season

Goalscorers

References

Notes

Atalanta B.C. seasons
Atalanta
Atalanta
Atalanta